William Brantingham (died 1548) was seneschal of the prior of Durham in 1536–1537.

William Brantingham or William de Brantingham may also refer to:

William de Brantingham, 14th-century knight 
William Brantingham, beneficiary of the will of Thomas Sparke, Bishop of Berwick